Double Indemnity is a 1973 American made-for-television crime film directed by Jack Smight and starring Richard Crenna, Lee J. Cobb, Robert Webber and Samantha Eggar. It was a remake of Double Indemnity (1944) based on the film rather than the original novel.

Plot
A scheming wife lures an insurance salesman into helping murder her husband and then declare it an accident. The salesman's boss, not knowing his man is involved in it, suspects murder and sets out to prove it.

Cast
 Richard Crenna as Walter Neff
 Lee J. Cobb as Barton Keyes
 Robert Webber as Edward Norton
 Samantha Eggar as Phyllis Dietrickson
 Arch Johnson as Dietrickson
 Kathleen Cody as Lola Dietrickson
 John Fiedler as Mr. Jackson
 John Elerick as Donald Franklin
 Joan Pringle as Neff's Secretary
 Gene Dynarski as Sam Bonventura
 Ken Renard as Porter
 Joyce Cunning as Norton's Secretary
 Arnold F. Turner as Redcap (as Arnold Turner)

Production
Producer Charles Egelman got Steven Bochco to update the film but did not substantially change it. They showed the script to Billy Wilder who gave his approval.

Reception
The New York Times said the film "amounts to a flattish copy".

See also
 List of American films of 1973
 ABC Movie of the Week

References

External links
 Double Indemnity at TCMDB
 Double Indemnity at Letterbox DVD
 Double Indemnity at IMDb
 
 

1973 television films
1973 films
Films scored by Billy Goldenberg
Films directed by Jack Smight
American television films